This is a list of romantic comedy films, ordered by year of release.

Before 1950

1950 – 1969

1970 – 1989

1990s

2000s

2010s

2020s

See also
List of romantic comedy television series
List of romance films

References

 
Lists of films by genre
Lists of comedy films